Chippindale may refer to:

People with the surname
Christopher Chippindale (born 1951), British archaeologist
Peter Chippindale (1945–2014), British newspaper journalist and author
Ron Chippindale (1933–2008), New Zealand air inspector 
Thomas Chippendale (1718–1779), English cabinet-maker and furniture designer in the mid-Georgian, English Rococo, and Neoclassical styles

Places
Chippendale, New South Wales, a small inner-city suburb of Sydney, New South Wales, Australia

See also
Chippendales, touring British dance troupe best known for its male striptease performances and for its dancers' distinctive upper body costume of a bow tie and shirt cuffs worn on an otherwise bare torso
The Chippendale Society, charitable entity, to preserve and promote the name and work of  furniture maker Thomas Chippendale
Chinese Chippendale (architecture), inspired by the work of Thomas Chippendale